The Northern Chamber Orchestra (NCO) is a chamber orchestra based in Manchester, England.  Established in 1967, the orchestra gives concerts at Heritage Centre, Macclesfield and The Stoller Hall, Manchester as well as a Christmas concert at Tatton Park, Knutsford and one-off engagements around the country. They are also currently the resident orchestra for the Buxton Festival.

As of the 2010–2011 season, the orchestra contains 19 musicians. Diana Cummings was leader and soloist of the NCO for 10 years, from 1975 to 1985. The orchestra's musical director and leader from 1985 to 2022 was the English violinist Nicholas Ward.

The orchestra has recorded commercially for the Naxos label, including works by composers such as Joseph Haydn, Wolfgang Amadeus Mozart and Georg Philipp Telemann.

References

External links
 Official Northern Chamber Orchestra website
 Naxos Records profile of the NCO
 East Riding of Yorkshire Council, 16 September 2008, information on £3,750 grant from Orchestras Live
 Royal Academy of Music biography of Diana Cummings
 Musicweb International website review of Naxos 8.554019, Telemann, Don Quixote Suite

Chamber orchestras
English orchestras
Musical groups from Manchester
Musical groups established in 1967
1967 establishments in England